Saskatoon—University is a federal electoral district in Saskatchewan. It encompasses a portion of Saskatchewan previously included in the electoral districts of Saskatoon—Humboldt and Saskatoon—Wanuskewin.

Saskatoon—University was created by the 2012 federal electoral boundaries redistribution and was legally defined in the 2013 representation order. It came into effect upon the call of the 42nd Canadian federal election, scheduled for 19 October 2015.

In the 2021 Canadian federal election, Corey Tochor of the Conservative Party was re-elected to a second term in office.

Members of Parliament

This riding has elected the following Members of Parliament:

Election results

References

Saskatchewan federal electoral districts
Politics of Saskatoon